A list of politicians and notable members of the Social Democratic Party of Germany:


A B C D E F G H I J K L M N O P Q R S T U V W X Y Z

A

 Sanae Abdi
 Karl Aberle
 Wolfgang Abendroth
 Kurt Adams
 Dieter Aderhold
 Lore Agnes
 Johannes Agnoli
 Adis Ahmetovic
 Lale Akgün
 Heinrich Albertz
 Luise Albertz
 Torsten Albig
 Britta Altenkamp
 Jakob Altmaier
 Gregor Amann
 Gerd Andres
 Niels Annen
 Hans Apel
 Bruno Apitz
 Jan Appel
 Max Archimowitz
 Martha Arendsee
 Walter Arendt
 Johannes Arlt
 Ingrid Arndt-Brauer
 Rainer Arnold
 Leo Arons
 Karl Artelt
 Rosa Aschenbrenner
 Jörg Asmussen
 Siegfried Aufhäuser
 Elise Augustat
 Ferdinand Auth

B
 Till Backhaus
 Ernst Bader
 Egon Bahr
 Ernst Bahr
 Karl Baier
 Walter Ballhause
 Hans Baluschek
 Arnulf Baring
 Doris Barnett
 Hans-Peter Bartels
 Karl Barth
 Klaus Barthel
 Kurt Barthel
 Max Barthel
 Sören Bartol
 Bernhard Bästlein
 Sabine Bätzing
 Fritz Bauer
 Gustav Bauer
 Andreas Bausewein
 August Bebel
 Karl Bechert
 Willi Becker
 Uwe Beckmeyer
 Walter Behrendt
 Klaus Uwe Benneter
 Albert Berg
 Axel Berg
 Ute Berg
 Christine Bergmann
 Karl Bergmann
 Ludwig Bergsträsser
 Karl Wilhelm Berkhan
 Eduard Bernstein
 Jens Beutel
 Petra Bierwirth
 Karin Binder
 Rudolf Bindig
 Lothar Binding
 Frieder Birzele
 Peter Blachstein
 Willi Bleicher
 Joseph Bloch
 Volker Blumentritt
 Christoph Blumhardt
 Hans Böckler
 Arnold Bode
 Kurt Bodewig
 Ibrahim Böhme
 Rolf Böhme
 Björn Böhning
 Gustav Böhrnsen
 Jens Böhrnsen
 Clemens Bollen
 Gerd Bollmann
 Julian Borchardt
 Holger Börner
 Hermann Böse
 Heinrich Brandler
 Klaus Brandner
 Heinz Brandt
 Willy Brandt
 Willi Brase
 Max Brauer
 Lily Braun
 Otto Braun
 Julius Brecht
 Fred Breinersdorfer
 Rudolf Breitscheid
 Sylvia Bretschneider
 Hermann Breymann
 Hermann Brill
 Bernhard Brinkmann
 Rainer Brinkmann
 Hans Brodmerkel
 James Broh
 Erich Brost
 Manfred Bruns
 Werner Bruschke
 Christine Buchholz
 Daniel Buchholz
 Albert Buchmann
 Wilhelm Buck
 Hermann Budzislawski
 Udo Bullmann
 Edelgard Bulmahn
 Andreas von Bülow
 Marco Bülow
 Ulla Burchardt
 Martin Burkert
 Michael Bürsch
 Heinz Buschkowsky

C
 Ursula Caberta
 Christian Carstensen
 Marion Caspers-Merk
 Wolfgang Clement
 Max Cohen
 Arthur Crispien
 Heinrich Cunow

D
 Gustav Dahrendorf
 Ralf Dahrendorf
 Peter Danckert
 Herta Däubler-Gmelin
 Robert Daum
 Ernst Däumig
 Eduard David
 Franz Josef Degenhardt
 Willy Dehnkamp
 Bärbel Dieckmann
 Georg Diederichs
 Bruno Diekmann
 Wilhelm Dittmann
 Klaus von Dohnanyi
 Hilde Domin
 Heinrich Drake
 Hanno Drechsler
 Wilhelm Dreher
 Horst Dreier
 Malu Dreyer
 Franziska Drohsel
 Garrelt Duin
 Käte Duncker

E
 Fritz Eberhard
 Hugo Eberlein
 Friedrich Ebert
 Friedrich Ebert junior
 Michael Ebling
 Sebastian Edathy
 Horst Ehmke
 Herbert Ehrenberg
 Hans Eichel
 Emil Eichhorn
 Wilhelmine Eichler
 Willi Eichler
 Heinrich Graf von Einsiedel
 Kurt Eisner
 Irene Ellenberger
 August Enderle
 Irmgard Enderle
 Ludwig Engel
 Ursula Engelen-Kefer
 Erhard Eppler
 Klaus Ernst
 Hermann Esser
 Karin Evers-Meyer
 Carmen Everts
 Arthur Ewert

F
 Alfred Faust
 Felix Fechenbach
 Max Fechner
 Josef Felder
 Ludwig Fellermaier
 Friedrich Kurt Fiedler
 Rüdiger Fikentscher
 Erwin Fischer
 Ottfried Fischer
 Peter Fischer
 Richard Fischer
 Robert Fischer (unionist)
 Ossip K. Flechtheim
 Knut Fleckenstein
 Hermann Fleissner
 Katharina Focke
 Ernst Fraenkel
 Ludwig Frank
 Egon Franke
 Otto Franke
 Paul Franken
 Freimut Duve
 Walter Freitag
 Alfred Frenzel
 Philipp Fries
 Friedrich Wilhelm Fritzsche
 Paul Frölich
 Heinz Fromm
 Anke Fuchs
 Eduard Fuchs
 Emil Fuchs
 Erich Fuchs

G
 Fritz Gäbler
 Sigmar Gabriel
 Georg Gaßmann
 Ferdinand Gatzweiler
 Evelyne Gebhardt
 Herta Geffke
 Julius Gehl
 Jens Geier
 Anton Geiß
 Imanuel Geiss
 Heiko Gentzel
 Volker Gerhardt
 Florian Gerster
 Anna Geyer
 Norbert Glante
 Gerhard Glogowski
 Peter Glotz
 Arthur Goldstein
 Ivo Gönner
 Herta Gotthelf
 Georg Gradnauer
 Günter Grass
 Helga Grebing
 Armand Gregg
 Monika Griefahn
 Adolf Grimme
 Lissy Gröner
 Otto Grotewohl
 Karl Grünberg
 Anton Grylewicz
 Albert Grzesinski
 Kurt Gscheidle
 Günter Guillaume
 Ravindra Gujjula
 Mustafa Güngör
 Wolfgang Gunkel
 Ketty Guttmann

H
 Hugo Haase
 Konrad Haenisch
 Wilhelm Haferkamp
 Anton Hammerbacher
 Klaus Hänsch
 Werner Hansen
 Georg Häring
 Ernst von Harnack
 Peter Hartz
 Wilhelm Hasenclever
 Theodor Haubach
 Volker Hauff
 Jutta Haug
 Fritz Heckert
 Gustav Heckmann
 Konrad Heiden
 Hubertus Heil
 Ernst Heilmann
 Eduard Heimann
 Willi Hein
 Fritz Heine
 Wolfgang Heine
 Gustav Heinemann
 Kurt Heinig
 Barbara Hendricks
 Alfred Henke
 Rolf Henrich
 Fritz Henßler
 Gottlieb Hering
 Carl Herz
 Dora Heyenn
 Gerhard Hildebrand
 Regine Hildebrandt
 Rudolf Hilferding
 Petra Hinz
 Martin Hirsch
 Paul Hirsch
 Max Hirschberg
 Wilhelm Höcker
 Wilhelm Hoegner
 Adolf Hofer
 Christel Hoffmann
 Johannes Hoffmann
 Oskar Hoffmann
 Hartmut Holzapfel
 Bodo Hombach
 Reinhard Höppner
 Otto Hörsing
 Jasmina Hostert
 Albert Hotopp
 Franz Hruska
 Antje Huber
 Wolfgang Huber
 Paul Hug
 Herbert Hupka

I
Karl Ibach

J
 Eberhard Jäckel
 Franz Jacob
 Mathilde Jacob
 Hauke Jagau
 Ralf Jäger
 Gerhard Jahn
 Wenzel Jaksch
 Heinrich Jasper
 Leo Jogiches
 Karin Jöns
 Wolfgang Jörg
 Reinhold Jost
 Marie Juchacz
 Burkhard Jung
 Thomas Jung
 Gustav Just
 Wolfgang Jüttner

K
 Emmy Kaemmerer
 Luise Kähler
 Wilhelmine Kähler
 Johannes Kahrs
 Wilhelm Kaisen
 Roland Kaiser
 Hermann-Josef Kaltenborn
 Helmut Kasimier
 Rudolf Katz
 Sylvia-Yvonne Kaufmann
 Karl Kautsky
 Friedrich Kellner
 Petra Kelly
 Karl-Hans Kern
 Hakki Keskin
 Johanna Kirchner
 Reinhard Klimmt
 Hans-Ulrich Klose
 Heinz Kluncker
 Johann Knief
 Karl Koch
 Bernard Koenen
 Wilhelm Koenen
 Walter Kolbow
 Hinrich Wilhelm Kopf
 Olga Körner
 Karl Korsch
 Otto Körting
 Hans Koschnick
 Adolf Köster
 Hannelore Kraft
 Emil Krause
 Constanze Krehl
 Wolfgang Kreissl-Dörfler
 Jürgen Krogmann
 Georg Kronawitter
 Hedwig Krüger
 Hans-Jürgen Krupp
 Alfred Kubel
 Fritz Kuhn
 Heinz Kühn
 Marianne Kühn
 Helmut Kuhne
 Franz Künstler
 Karl-Heinz Kurras
 Wolfram Kuschke

L
 Oskar Lafontaine
 Manfred Lahnstein
 Otto Landsberg
 Antonie Langendorf
 David Langner
 Heinrich Laufenberg
 Lauritz Lauritzen
 Karl Lauterbach (SPD)
 Georg Leber
 Julius Leber
 Georg Ledebour
 Emil Lederer
 Carl Legien
 Helmut Lehmann
 Jo Leinen
 Willi Lemke
 Alfred Lemmnitz
 Paul Lensch
 Hanfried Lenz
 Willy Leow
 Wilhelm Leuschner
 Paul Levi
 Eugen Leviné
 Alfred Levy
 Kurt Lichtenstein
 Karl Liebknecht
 Wilhelm Liebknecht
 Hermann Liebmann
 Jutta Limbach
 Rudolf Lindau
 Richard Lipinski
 Burkhard Lischka
 Paul Löbe
 Richard Löwenthal
 Paul Lohmann
 Wolf von Lojewski
 Siegfried Lorenz
 Kurt Löwenstein
 Hermann Lübbe
 Heidi Lück
 Christine Lucyga
 Hermann Lüdemann
 Kirsten Lühmann
 Erich Lüth
 Rosa Luxemburg

M
 Heiko Maas
 Hermann Maaß
 Karl Mache
 Anton Maegerle
 Horst Mahler
 Ulrich Maly
 Bernhard Mann
 Erika Mann
 Herbert Marcuse
 Emil Martin
 Ludwig Marum
 Franz Marx
 Christoph Matschie
 Hans Matthöfer
 Max Maurenbrecher
 Ulrich Maurer
 Gustav Mayer
 Hans Mayer
 Markus Meckel
 Franz Mehring
 Stefan Meier
 Susanne Melior
 Ernst Melsheimer
 Dirk-Ulrich Mende
 Hans Merten
 Dagmar Metzger
 Heinz Meyer
 Robert Michels
 Matthias Miersch
 Susanne Miller
 Thomas Mirow
 Dieter Möhrmann
 Alexander Möller
 Hans Mommsen
 Walter Momper
 Edgar Moron
 Johann Most
 Julius Motteler
 Helga Mucke-Wittbrodt
 Erich Mückenberger
 Michael Müller (politician, born 1964)
 Peter Münstermann
 Franz Müntefering
 Mirjam Müntefering
 Oskar Munzinger

N
 Andrea Nahles
 Fritz Naphtali
 Michael Naumann
 Robert Neddermeyer
 Otto Nerz
 Wolfgang Nešković
 Gustav Neuring
 Paul Nevermann
 Julian Nida-Rümelin
 Ernst Niekisch
 Hans Nimmerfall
 Thomas Nipperdey
 Maria Noichl
 Gustav Noske

O
 Jutta Oesterle-Schwerin
 Paul Oestreich
 Rainer Offergeld
 Vural Öger
 Erich Ollenhauer
 Gerhard Olschewski
 Albert Osswald
 Otto Ostrowski
 Aydan Özoguz

P
 Norman Paech
 Anton Pannekoek
 Alexander Parvus
 Vallabhbhai Patel
 Ernst Paul
 Alfons Pawelczyk
 Wolfgang Pepper
 Horst Peter
 Detlev Peukert
 Martin Pfaff
 Werner Pidde
 Wilhelm Pieck
 Willi Piecyk
 Fritz Pleitgen
 Agnes Plum
 Michael Poeschke
 Günther Pohl
 Karl Otto Pöhl
 Käthe Popall
 Lothar Popp
 Claus Peter Poppe
 Franz Pöschl
 Diether Posser
 Markus Maria Profitlich
 Werner Pusch

R
 Heike Raab
 Sascha Raabe
 Gustav Radbruch
 Karl Radek
 Siegfried Rädel
 Bernhard Rapkay
 Wilhelm Rapp
 Johannes Rau
 Reinhard Rauball
 Maria Reese
 Anke Rehlinger
 Reinhold Rehs
 Steffen Reiche
 Bernhard Reichenbach
 Minna Reichert
 Adolf Reichwein
 Hans Reinowski
 Siegfried Reiprich
 Johanne Reitze
 Adam Remmele
 Hermann Remmele
 Annemarie Renger
 Karl Retzlaw
 Edzard Reuter
 Ernst Reuter
 Renate Riemeck
 Isolde Ries
 Walter Riester
 Harald Ringstorff
 Barbara Rinke
 Johannes Ritter
 Moritz Rittinghausen
 Ulrike Rodust
 Helmut Rohde
 Elisabeth Röhl
 Klaus Rainer Röhl
 Detlev Karsten Rohwedder
 Walter Romberg
 Max Roscher
 Julius Rosemann
 Arthur Rosenberg
 Otto Rosenberg
 Kurt Rosenfeld
 Philip Rosenthal
 Wolfgang Rosenthal
 Lea Rosh
 Rudolf Ross
 Albert Roßhaupter
 Jürgen Roters
 Katharina Roth
 Michael Roth
 Mechtild Rothe
 Frida Rubiner
 Joachim Rücker
 Otto Rühle
 Ortwin Runde
 Bert Rürup

S
 Willi Sänger
 Thilo Sarrazin
 Karl Schabrod
 Thorsten Schäfer-Gümbel
 Paul Schaffer
 Rudolf Scharping
 Käthe Schaub
 Julius Schaxel
 Hermann Scheer
 Philipp Scheidemann
 Fritz Schenk
 Henning Scherf
 Frank Schildt
 Karl Schiller
 Konrad Schily
 Otto Schily
 Max Schippel
 Herbert Schirmer
 Marie Schlei
 Bernhard Schlink
 Volker Schlöndorff
 Carlo Schmid
 Eduard Schmid
 Nils Schmid
 Richard Schmid
 Helmut Schmidt
 Renate Schmidt
 Robert Schmidt
 Ulla Schmidt
 Adam Schmitt
 Jürgen Schmude
 Karl Schnabel
 Carsten Schneider
 Karl Heinz Schneider
 Ernst Schneppenhorst
 Adolph Schönfelder
 Olaf Scholz
 Arnold Schölzel
 Friedrich Schorlemmer
 Stefan Schostok
 Friedrich Schrader
 Carl Schreck
 Albert Schreiner
 Ottmar Schreiner
 Gerhard Schröder
 Karl Schröder
 Kurt Schröder
 Richard Schröder
 Wilhelm Heinz Schröder
 Louise Schroeder
 Albrecht Schröter
 Werner Schröter
 Hermann Schubert
 Katina Schubert
 Manfred Schüler
 Albert Schulz
 Heinrich Schulz
 Martin Schulz
 Oskar Schulz
 Peter Schulz
 Kurt Schumacher
 Joachim Schuster
 Stefan Schuster
 Werner Schuster
 Klaus Schütz
 Gesine Schwan
 Rolf Schwanitz
 Ernst Schwarz
 Thomas Schwarz
 Rita Schwarzelühr-Sutter
 Hans Schweitzer
 Manuela Schwesig
 Tino Schwierzina
 Kurt Schwitters
 Martin Segitz
 Elisabeth Selbert
 Erwin Sellering
 Carl Severing
 Max Seydewitz
 Carsten Sieling
 Max Sievers
 Robert Siewert
 Anna Simon
 Günter Simon
 Peter Simon
 Heide Simonis
 Paul Singer
 Hugo Sinzheimer
 Birgit Sippel
 Gustav Sobottka
 Fritz Soldmann
 Wilhelm Sollmann
 Paul Spiegel
 Alfons Spielhoff
 Dieter Spöri
 Klaus Staeck
 Ingrid Stahmer
 Wolfgang Stammberger
 Dorothee Stapelfeldt
 Hans Staudinger
 Erwin Staudt
 Johann Stegner
 Ralf Stegner
 Peer Steinbrück
 Karl Steinhoff
 Fritz Steinhoff
 Frank-Walter Steinmeier
 Jutta Steinruck
 Johannes Stelling
 Carola Stern
 Martin Stevens
 Anna Stiegler
 Ludwig Stiegler
 Christian Stock
 Ulrich Stockmann
 Karl Wilhelm Stolle
 Manfred Stolpe
 Richard Stöss
 Otto Strasser
 Dietrich Stobbe
 Heinrich Ströbel
 Käte Strobel
 Hans-Christian Ströbele
 Peter Struck
 Otto Suhr
 Stefan Szende

T
 Fritz Tarnow
 Johanna Tesch
 Silke Tesch
 August Thalheimer
 Bertha Thalheimer
 Ernst Thälmann
 Matthias Theisen
 Wolfgang Thierse
 Wolfgang Tiefensee
 Ernst Tillich
 Ernst Torgler
 Carl Wilhelm Tölcke
 Ferdinand Tönnies
 Klaus Toppmöller
 Karl Trabalski
 Heinrich Trinowitz
 Heinrich Troeger

U
 Christian Ude
 Fred Uhlmann
 Ernst Uhrlau
 Walter Ulbricht

V
 Egon Vaupel
 Carola Veit
 Günter Verheugen
 Hans Vogel
 Hans-Jochen Vogel
 Franz Vogt
 Roland Vogt
 Georg von Vollmar
 Wolfgang Völz
 Henning Voscherau

W
 Eduard Wald
 Orli Wald
 Jürgen Walter
 Ralf Walter
 Alma Wartenberg
 Alfred Weber
 Klaus Wedemeier
 Friedrich Wehmer
 Herbert Wehner
 Stephan Weil
 Barbara Weiler
 Gert Weisskirchen
 Ernst Ulrich von Weizsäcker
 Otto Wels
 Ernst Welteke
 Rainer Wend
 Georg Wendt
 Paul Wengert
 Helene Wessel
 Paul Wessel
 Hans Westermann
 Friedrich Westmeyer
 Heinz Westphal
 Heidemarie Wieczorek-Zeul
 Wolfgang Wiegard
 Reinhard Wilmbusse
 Thomas Wimmer
 Heinrich August Winkler
 Ernst Winter
 Rudolf Winter
 Hans-Jürgen Wischnewski
 Rudolf Wissell
 Wolfgang Wodarg
 Dietmar Woidke
 Fritz Wolffheim
 Rosi Wolfstein
 Klaus Wowereit
 Monika Wulf-Mathies
 Hans Wunderlich
 Mathilde Wurm
 Emil Wutzky

Y
 Andrea Ypsilanti

Z
 Uta Zapf
 Wolfgang Zeidler
 Erich Zeigner
 Clara Zetkin
 Anna Ziegler
 Jörg Ziercke
 Luise Zietz
 Hermann Zimmer
 Edwin Zimmermann
 Charlotte Zinke
 Georg August Zinn
 Fritz Zubeil
 Brigitte Zypries

 
Social Democratic Party of Germany